Mathis Lachuer (born 31 August 2000) is a French professional footballer who plays as a midfielder for Ligue 2 club Amiens.

Club career 
Lachuer made his professional debut with Amiens in a 2–0 Ligue 2 loss to Pau FC on 2 February 2021.

Personal life
Lachuer is the son of Julien Lachuer, and the nephew of Yann Lachuer, both professional footballers. Lachuer is of Martiniquais descent through his mother.

References

External links

2000 births
Living people
Sportspeople from Amiens
French footballers
French people of Martiniquais descent
Association football midfielders
Amiens SC players
Ligue 2 players
Championnat National 2 players
Footballers from Hauts-de-France